The 1999 East Carolina Pirates football team was an American football team that represented East Carolina University as a member of Conference USA during the 1999 NCAA Division I-A football season. In their eighth season under head coach Steve Logan, the team compiled a 9–3 record. The Pirates offense scored 333 points while the defense allowed 225 points.

Schedule

The game was moved from Greenville to Raleigh due to Hurricane Floyd.

References

East Carolina
East Carolina Pirates football seasons
East Carolina Pirates football